This list of mines in Mexico is subsidiary to the list of mines article and lists working, defunct and future mines in the country and is organised by the primary mineral output. For practical purposes stone, marble and other quarries may be included in this list.

Coal
Cloete

Copper
Buenavista mine
El Arco mine
El Pilar mine
La Caridad Mine

Gold
Camino Rojo mine
Cerro de San Pedro
Los Filos mine
Morelos mine
Naranjal mine
Ojuela
Peñasquito Polymetallic Mine

Manganese
Molango mine

Molybdenum 

 El Creston mine

Silver
Camino Rojo mine
La Colorada mine

References

 
Mexico